Luxembourg competed at the 1976 Summer Olympics in Montreal, Quebec, Canada. Eight competitors, all men, took part in seven events in four sports.

Athletics

Men's High Jump
 Marc Romersa
 Qualification — 2.05m (→ did not advance)

Men's 20 km Race Walk
 Lucien Faber — 1:36:21 (→ 28th place)

Cycling

Two cyclists represented Luxembourg in 1976.

Individual road race
Lucien Didier — did not finish (→ no ranking)
Marcel Thull — did not finish (→ no ranking)

Fencing

Two fencers represented Luxembourg in 1976.

Men's épée
 Roger Menghi
 Robert Schiel

Shooting

References

External links

Nations at the 1976 Summer Olympics
1976 Summer Olympics
1976 in Luxembourgian sport